Agyneta milleri is a species of sheet weaver spider in the family Linyphiidae, and is found in the Czech Republic and Slovakia. It was described by Thaler et al. in 1997.

References

milleri
Spiders of Europe
Spiders described in 1997